50/50 is a South African environmental television program that has aired on SABC since 1984.  The show seeks to deliver content on wildlife, conservation and environmental subjects with a focus on South Africa. The show's name 50/50 refers to the fifty fifty balance between humans and nature. It is one of the longest running environmental programs on air in the world. It has been broadcast on SABC 1, SABC 2, and SABC 3 at various times during its history; currently it is broadcast on SABC 2.  It is broadcast during prime-time from 19:00 to 20:00 on Monday.

Around 80% of the show's content is in English with the remaining 20% presented in Afrikaans.  A decision that was made in 2014 when the program was moved to SABC 3, previously the show's content was presented half in English and half in Afrikaans.

References

1980s South African television series
1990s South African television series
2000s South African television series
2010s South African television series
1987 South African television series debuts
South African television news shows
Environmental television
Nature educational television series